Jajce II Hydroelectric Power Station is a diversion type of hydroelectric power plant on the Vrbas river, whose and powerhouse (generation hall, generating station or generating plant) is situated underground  17 km downstream from town of Jajce, in Bosnia and Herzegovina. It use 3x10 MW generators, with total installed capacity of 30 MW.

See also

Vrbas
 Jajce I Hydroelectric Power Station

References

Hydroelectric power stations in Bosnia and Herzegovina
Underground hydroelectric power stations in Bosnia and Herzegovina